
Trübsee is an intermediate cable car station by the , Trüebsee (lit.: turbid lake, Germanized: Trübsee) is an Alpine lake on the Ober Trüebsee Alpine pasture (or often just incorrectly shortened to Trüebsee) in the upper part of the extensive municipality of  Wolfenschiessen in the Swiss canton of Nidwalden. The lake lies at the foot of the Titlis above the village resort of Engelberg. It can be reached from the village by cable car, or via several alpine walking paths, e.g. the Pfaffenwand.

The lake is a hydroelectric reservoir, providing water to the underground power station Trübsee (opened in 1968) near Engelberg, before flowing into the lake Eugenisee.

See also
List of mountain lakes of Switzerland

References

External links

Lakes of Nidwalden
Lakes of Switzerland
RTrübsee
Engelberg